Shenzhen Daily is an English-language newspaper published in Shenzhen. Established on July 1, 1997, Shenzhen Daily is the first local English-language daily on the southern Chinese mainland.

History

Shenzhen Daily began publication in 1997 as a sister newspaper to its Chinese-language counterpart. It is currently the only English-language daily newspaper in southern Mainland China.

References

Daily newspapers published in China
English-language newspapers published in China
Mass media in Shenzhen
Newspapers established in 1997
1997 establishments in China